Roy Michael Harrison (born 1948)  is a British academic who is the Queen Elizabeth II Birmingham Centenary Professor of Environmental health at the University of Birmingham in the UK and a Distinguished Adjunct Professor at King Abdulaziz University in Jeddah, Saudi Arabia.

Education 
Harrison was educated at Henley Grammar School and the University of Birmingham where he was awarded a Bachelor of Science degree in Chemistry in 1969, followed by a PhD in Organic chemistry in 1972 and a Doctor of Science in Environmental chemistry in 1989. His PhD research investigated sigmatropic reactions of tropolone ethers.

Research and career 
Harrison is an expert on air pollution, specialising in the area of airborne particulates, including nanoparticles.  His interests extend from source emissions, through atmospheric chemical and physical transformations, to human exposures and effects upon health.  His most significant work has been in the field of vehicle emitted particles, including their chemical composition and atmospheric processing.  This forms the basis of the current understanding of the relationship of emissions to roadside concentrations and size distributions.

In addition to leading a large project on diesel exhaust particles, he is also engaged in major collaborative studies of processes determining air quality in Beijing and Delhi.

Awards and honours 
Harrison's work has been recognised by award of the John Jeyes Medal and Environment Prize of the Royal Society of Chemistry and the Fitzroy Prize of the Royal Meteorological Society.  He has served for many years as a chair and/or member of advisory committees of the Department for Environment, Food and Rural Affairs (Defra) and the Department of Health.  He was appointed Order of the British Empire OBE in the 2004 New Year Honours for services to environmental science and elected a Fellow of the Royal Society (FRS) in 2017.

References 

Fellows of the Royal Society
Fellows of the Royal Society of Chemistry
Officers of the Order of the British Empire
Living people
1948 births
Air pollution in the United Kingdom